La Grand-Croix is a commune and the seat of a canton in the Loire department in central France. It lies in the Gier valley.

The commune was the main town of the former canton of La Grand-Croix, arrondissement of Saint-Étienne.

It lies on the A47 autoroute.
The commune is close to the Parc Naturel Régional du Pilat.

The river Dorlay, a tributary of the Gier that rises in Mont Pilat, forms the border between La Grand-Croix and Lorette.

Population

Twin towns
La Grand-Croix is twinned with:

  Santa Cruz de la Zarza, Spain, since 1993

See also
Communes of the Loire department

References

Communes of Loire (department)